One Records is a record label based in Belgrade, Serbia.

Formed in 1999, its catalogue covers a fairly wide musical spectrum - from hard rock and heavy metal bands such as Alogia, Cactus Jack, Dargoron, Stratus, and others, to Irish folk/Celtic rock bands Tir na n'Og and Irish Stew of Sindidun, to the local hip-hop scene with acts like Bad Copy, Škabo, Ajs Nigrutin, Wikluh Sky, and others.

The label has also rereleased albums by Bjesovi, Ekatarina Velika, Goblini, Oktobar 1864, Riblja Čorba, Smak, Vlatko Stefanovski, Suncokret, S Vremena Na Vreme, Van Gogh, YU Grupa, and others. One Records has also released albums by Divlje Jagode, Jørn Lande, Osmi Putnik, Pretty Maids, Toto, Joe Lynn Turner, Whitesnake, and other acts for the Serbian market.

Artists 
Some of the artists currently signed to One Records, or who have been in the past, are:
Ajs Nigrutin
Alogia
Griva
Bad Copy
Bombarder
Cactus Jack
Dargoron
Divlje Jagode
Forever Storm
Irish Stew of Sindidun
Karizma
Monolit
Muzika Poludelih
Osmi Putnik
Ritam Nereda
Smak
Stratus
Sunshine
Škabo
Tir na n'Og
Wikluh Sky
Zona B

External links
 Official website
 One Records at Discogs

See also
 List of record labels

Serbian record labels
Serbian rock music
Record labels established in 1999
Rock record labels
Hip hop record labels
1999 establishments in Serbia